Syrphophagus is a genus of wasps belonging to the family Encyrtidae.

The genus has cosmopolitan distribution.

Species:

Syrphophagus acamas 
Syrphophagus aeruginosus 
Syrphophagus africanus 
Syrphophagus amabilis 
Syrphophagus annellicornis 
Syrphophagus annulipes 
Syrphophagus aphidivorus 
Syrphophagus aquacyaneus 
Syrphophagus ariantes 
Syrphophagus arundinicola 
Syrphophagus bacchae 
Syrphophagus brevipes 
Syrphophagus cassatus 
Syrphophagus cecidium 
Syrphophagus celia 
Syrphophagus chinensis 
Syrphophagus cinctipes 
Syrphophagus danuvicus 
Syrphophagus dlabolianus 
Syrphophagus elaeagni 
Syrphophagus fabulosus 
Syrphophagus feralis 
Syrphophagus flavicornis 
Syrphophagus flavithorax 
Syrphophagus flavitibiae 
Syrphophagus fuscipes 
Syrphophagus gracilis 
Syrphophagus hakki 
Syrphophagus herbidus 
Syrphophagus hofferi 
Syrphophagus hyalipennis 
Syrphophagus injuriosus 
Syrphophagus jucundus 
Syrphophagus kasparyani 
Syrphophagus kostjukovi 
Syrphophagus kovalevi 
Syrphophagus kumaoensis 
Syrphophagus lachni 
Syrphophagus lineola 
Syrphophagus luciani 
Syrphophagus mamitus 
Syrphophagus marilandicus 
Syrphophagus mercetii 
Syrphophagus metallicus 
Syrphophagus nigricornis 
Syrphophagus nigricornis 
Syrphophagus nigrocyaneus 
Syrphophagus nubeculus 
Syrphophagus obscurus 
Syrphophagus occidentalis 
Syrphophagus orientalis 
Syrphophagus pacificus 
Syrphophagus parvus 
Syrphophagus parvus 
Syrphophagus perdubius 
Syrphophagus pertiades 
Syrphophagus philotis 
Syrphophagus puparia 
Syrphophagus qadrii 
Syrphophagus quadrimaculatae 
Syrphophagus quercicola 
Syrphophagus raffaellini 
Syrphophagus rossittenicus 
Syrphophagus rotundatus 
Syrphophagus rugulosus 
Syrphophagus semipurpureus 
Syrphophagus similis 
Syrphophagus smithi 
Syrphophagus sosius 
Syrphophagus splaeophoriae 
Syrphophagus staryi 
Syrphophagus subviridis 
Syrphophagus tachikawai 
Syrphophagus taeniatus 
Syrphophagus taiwanus 
Syrphophagus terebratus 
Syrphophagus transsylvanicus 
Syrphophagus varicornis 
Syrphophagus vicinus 
Syrphophagus wayanadensis

References

Encyrtidae